Dear Eleanor is a 2016 American film, directed by Kevin Connolly, and starring Isabelle Fuhrman, Josh Lucas, Liana Liberato, and Jessica Alba. Written by Cecilia Contreras and Amy Garcia, it is a coming of age story about two best friends traveling across the U.S. in 1962 to meet their childhood hero, Eleanor Roosevelt.

Plot
In 1962, in the shadow of the Cuban Missile Crisis, two teenage girls (Isabelle Fuhrman and Liana Liberato) break out of their normal life, jump in the car and embark on a trip across the country in search of the former First Lady of the United States, Eleanor Roosevelt.  Their Thelma & Louise cross-country adventure is a mix of hilarious joy ride and an empowering personal odyssey that not only tests their friendship for the first time but also lands the girls in jail.

Cast

 Isabelle Fuhrman as Maxine ”Max the Wax” Wax
 Liana Liberato as Eleanor ”Ellie” Potter
 Jessica Alba as Aunt el
 Josh Lucas as Frank Morris
 Ione Skye as Charlotte
 Luke Wilson as Bob Potter
 Patrick Schwarzenegger as Bud
 Joel Courtney as Billy
 Paul Johansson as Hugh
 Claire van der Boom as Caroline Potter

Production
Chuck Pacheco, Hillary Sherman and Caleb Applegate produced the film, which began shooting in Boulder County, Colorado on May 14, 2013. The town of Niwot doubled for 1960s town of Manteca, California. Towns in Colorado's Front Range section of the Rocky Mountains, including Longmont, Lyons, Nederland, Boulder and Hygiene, were also used as locations. Filming took place in Downtown Denver at the Paramount Theatre before shooting wrapped in mid-June. Re-shoots occurred approximately a year later. A Colorado state economic incentive program helped to attract the production, which would spend $2.5 million in the state.

Release
The film was released on video on demand and DVD on July 5, 2016.

References

External links
 
 

2016 films
2016 comedy-drama films
2010s coming-of-age comedy-drama films
American coming-of-age comedy-drama films
American road comedy-drama films
Cultural depictions of Eleanor Roosevelt
Destination Films films
Films about the Cuban Missile Crisis
Films directed by Kevin Connolly
Films scored by Aaron Zigman
Films set in 1962
Films shot in Colorado
2010s English-language films
2010s American films